Bid Zard or Bidzard or Bid-i-Zard may refer to:
 Bid-e Zard, Shibkaveh, Fasa County, Fars Province
 Bid Zard, Kazerun, Fars Province
 Bid Zard, Kharameh, Fars Province
 Bid Zard, Mamasani, Fars Province
 Bid Zard-e Olya, Shiraz County, Fars Province
 Bid Zard-e Sofla, Shiraz County, Fars Province
 Bid Zard, Bagh-e Malek, Khuzestan Province
 Bid Zard, Behbahan, Khuzestan Province
 Bid Zard, Izeh, Khuzestan Province
 Bidzard, Bahmai, Kohgiluyeh and Boyer-Ahmad Province
 Bidzard, Gachsaran, Kohgiluyeh and Boyer-Ahmad Province
 Bid Zard Rural District, in Fars Province